Thomas Oliver Flowers (born 26 January 1988) is an English cricketer. Flowers is a right-handed batsman who bowls right-arm off break. He was born in Leicester, Leicestershire.

Flowers made his first-class debut for Loughborough UCCE against Surrey in 2008. In this match he scored 4 runs before being dismissed by Saqlain Mushtaq. He appeared in a further first-class match in 2008, against Gloucestershire. In this match, he scored 22 runs in Loughborough's first-innings, before being dismissed by David Brown. In their second-innings he scored an unbeaten 25 runs.

Flowers made his debut for Dorset in the 2011 MCCA Knockout Trophy against Oxfordshire.

Since his spell with Leicestershire County Cricket Club, he went on to be a successful Level 3 ECB qualified coach and Master in charge of cricket at Sherborne Boys School, Dorset, where he also taught Geography.

In 2015, Flowers set up his own independent cricket coaching business based in Leicestershire and Rutland, providing a range of coaching services to the area.

References

External links
Thomas Flowers at ESPNcricinfo
Thomas Flowers at CricketArchive

1988 births
Living people
Cricketers from Leicester
English cricketers
Loughborough MCCU cricketers
Dorset cricketers